Imbarek Shamekh (sometimes Mubarak Abdallah al-Shamikh or Embarek Shamekh) (born 15 May 1952) is a Libyan politician and bureaucrat. He served as the Secretary-General of General People's Congress of Libya (head of state) from 2009 to 2010. He previously served as Deputy Prime Minister from 2008 to 2009, and Prime Minister from 2000 to 2003.

Early life and education
Shamekh was born on 15 May 1952 in Benghazi, Libya. He moved to the United States, and attended college at the University of Central Florida in Orlando, Florida, where he graduated in 1981 with a degree in engineering.

Career
From February 1982 to March 1984, Shamekh was the Minister of Transportation for Benghazi. From March 1984 until October 1990, he served as Minister of Transportation. He was Governor of Sirte province from October 1990 to December 1992, and the Minister of Housing and Utilities from December 1992 to March 2000.

In March 2000, Libya made sweeping changes to its cabinet structure. Twelve ministers were replaced and the Prime Minister and Foreign Minister were replaced. From then until June 2003, Shamekh was Prime Minister (also known as General Secretary of the General People's Committee).

Shamekh was President of the Higher Planning Council of Libya from June 2003 until September 2004. From September 2004 to January 2005 he served as the Governor of Benghazi. He served as Deputy Prime Minister March 2008 to March 2009, when he resigned his post to become Secretary-General of General People's Congress of Libya.

In February 2011, during the Libyan Civil War, he defected to Egypt.

In a leaked phone call between Muammar Gaddafi and Tayeb El Safi from March 2011, Gaddafi expressed his shock at Shamenkh's defection.

References

|-

1952 births
Living people
University of Central Florida alumni
People from Benghazi
Heads of state of Libya
Secretaries-General of the General People's Congress
Prime Ministers of Libya
Government ministers of Libya
Libyan Arab Socialist Union politicians
Transport ministers of Libya
Libyan defectors
Libyan emigrants to Egypt